Converse is a Census-designated place located in Spartanburg County in the U.S. State of South Carolina. According to the 2010 United States Census, the population was 608.

Geography
Converse is located at  (34.995665, -81.843059). These coordinates place the CDP in the east side of the county, between the city of Spartanburg and the town of Cowpens.

According to the United States Census Bureau, the CDP has a total land area of 0.690  square mile (1.786 km) and a total water area of 0.011  square miles (0.029  km).

Demographics

Notable person
Art Fowler, pitcher and pitching coach in Major League Baseball

References

Census-designated places in Spartanburg County, South Carolina
Census-designated places in South Carolina